Henry Wager Halleck (January 16, 1815 – January 9, 1872) was a senior United States Army officer, scholar, and lawyer. A noted expert in military studies, he was known by a nickname that became derogatory: "Old Brains". He was an important participant in the admission of California as a state and became a successful lawyer and land developer. Halleck served as the General in Chief of the Armies of the United States from 1862 to 1864.

Early in the American Civil War, Halleck was a senior Union Army commander in the Western Theater. He commanded operations in the Western Theater from 1861 until 1862, during which time, while the Union armies in the east were defeated and held back, the troops under Halleck's command won many important victories. However, Halleck was not present at the battles, and his subordinates earned most of the recognition. The only operation in which Halleck exercised field command was the siege of Corinth in the spring of 1862, a Union victory which he conducted with extreme caution. Halleck also developed rivalries with many of his subordinate generals, such as Ulysses S. Grant and Don Carlos Buell. In July 1862, following Major General George B. McClellan's failed Peninsula Campaign in the Eastern Theater, Halleck was promoted to general in chief. Halleck served in this capacity for about a year and a half.

Halleck was a cautious general who believed strongly in thorough preparations for battle and in the value of defensive fortifications over quick, aggressive action. He was a master of administration, logistics, and the politics necessary at the top of the military hierarchy, but exerted little effective control over field operations from his post in Washington, D.C. His subordinates frequently criticized him and at times ignored his instructions. President Abraham Lincoln once described him as "little more than a first rate clerk."

In March 1864, Grant was promoted to general in chief, and Halleck was relegated to chief of staff. Without the pressure of having to control the movements of the armies, Halleck performed capably in this task, ensuring that the Union armies were well-equipped.

Early life
Halleck was born on a farm in Westernville, Oneida County, New York, third child of 14 of Joseph Halleck, a lieutenant who served in the War of 1812, and Catherine Wager Halleck. Young Henry detested the thought of an agricultural life and ran away from home at an early age to be raised by an uncle, David Wager of Utica. He attended Hudson Academy and Union College, then the United States Military Academy. He became a favorite of military theorist Dennis Hart Mahan and was allowed to teach classes while still a cadet. He graduated in 1839, third in his class of 31 cadets, as a second lieutenant of engineers. After spending a few years improving the defenses of New York Harbor, he wrote a report for the United States Senate on seacoast defenses, Report on the Means of National Defence, which pleased General Winfield Scott, who rewarded Halleck with a trip to Europe in 1844 to study European fortifications and the French military. Returning home a first lieutenant, Halleck gave a series of twelve lectures at the Lowell Institute in Boston that were subsequently published in 1846 as Elements of Military Art and Science. His work, one of the first expressions of American military professionalism, was well received by his colleagues and was considered one of the definitive tactical treatises used by officers in the coming Civil War. His scholarly pursuits earned him the (later derogatory) nickname "Old Brains."

During the Mexican–American War, Halleck was assigned to duty in California. During his seven-month journey on the transport USS Lexington around Cape Horn, assigned as aide-de-camp to Commodore William Shubrick, he translated Henri Jomini's Vie politique et militaire de Napoleon, which further enhanced his reputation for scholarship. He spent several months in California constructing fortifications, then was first exposed to combat on November 11, 1847, during Shubrick's capture of the port of Mazatlán; Lt. Halleck served as lieutenant governor of the occupied city. He was awarded a brevet promotion to captain in 1847 for his "gallant and meritorious service" in California and Mexico. (He would later be appointed captain in the regular army on July 1, 1853.) He was transferred north to serve under General Bennet Riley, the governor general of the California Territory. Halleck was soon appointed military secretary of state, a position which made him the governor's representative at the 1849 convention in Monterey where the California state constitution was written. Halleck became one of the principal authors of the document. The California State Military Museum writes that Halleck "was [at the convention] and in a lone measure its brains because he had given more studious thought to the subject than any other, and General Riley had instructed him to help frame the new constitution." He was nominated during the convention to be one of two men to represent the new state in the United States Senate, but received only enough votes for third place. During his political activities, he found time to join a law firm in San Francisco, Halleck, Peachy & Billings, which became so successful that he resigned his commission in 1854. The following year, he married Elizabeth Hamilton, granddaughter of Alexander Hamilton and sister of Union general Schuyler Hamilton. Their only child, Henry Wager Halleck, Jr., was born in 1856, and died in 1882.

Halleck became a wealthy man as a lawyer and land speculator, and a noted collector of "Californiana." He obtained thousands of pages of official documents on the Spanish missions and colonization of California, which were copied and are now maintained by the Bancroft Library of the University of California, the originals having been destroyed in the 1906 San Francisco earthquake and fire. He built the Montgomery Block, San Francisco's first fireproof building, home to lawyers, businessmen, and later, the city's Bohemian writers and newspapers. He was a director of the Almaden Quicksilver (Mercury) Company in San Jose, president of the Atlantic and Pacific Railroad, a builder in Monterey, and owner of the 30,000 acre (120 km2) Rancho Nicasio in Marin County. But he remained involved in military affairs and by early 1861 he was a major general of the California Militia.

Civil War

Western Theater
As the Civil War began, Halleck was nominally a Democrat and was sympathetic to the South, but he had a strong belief in the value of the Union. His reputation as a military scholar and an urgent recommendation from Winfield Scott earned him the rank of major general in the regular army, effective August 19, 1861, making him the fourth most senior general (after Scott, George B. McClellan, and John C. Frémont). He was assigned to command the Department of the Missouri, replacing Frémont in St. Louis on November 9, and his talent for administration quickly sorted out the chaos of fraud and disorder left by his predecessor. He set to work on the "twin goals of expanding his command and making sure that no blame of any sort fell on him."

Historian Kendall Gott described Halleck as a department commander:

Halleck established an uncomfortable relationship with the man who would become his most successful subordinate and future commander, Brig. Gen. Ulysses S. Grant. The pugnacious Grant had just completed the minor, but bloody, Battle of Belmont and had ambitious plans for amphibious operations on the Tennessee and Cumberland Rivers. Halleck, by nature a cautious general, but also judging that Grant's reputation for alcoholism in the prewar period made him unreliable, rejected Grant's plans. However, under pressure from President Lincoln to take offensive action, Halleck reconsidered and Grant conducted operations with naval and land forces against Forts Henry and Donelson in February 1862, capturing both, along with 14,000 Confederates.

Grant had delivered the first significant Union victory of the war. Halleck obtained a promotion for him to major general of volunteers, along with some other generals in his department, and used the victory as an opportunity to request overall command in the Western Theater, which he currently shared with Maj. Gen. Don Carlos Buell, but which was not granted. He briefly relieved Grant of field command of a newly ordered expedition up the Tennessee River after Grant met Buell in Nashville, citing rumors of renewed alcoholism, but soon restored Grant to field command (pressure by Lincoln and the War Department may have been a factor in this about-face). Explaining the reinstatement to Grant, Halleck portrayed it as his effort to correct an injustice, not revealing to Grant that the injustice had originated with him. When Grant wrote to Halleck suggesting "I must have enemies between you and myself," Halleck replied, "You are mistaken. There is no enemy between you and me."

Halleck's department performed well in early 1862, driving the Confederates from the state of Missouri and advancing into Arkansas. They held all of West Tennessee and half of Middle Tennessee. Grant, not yet aware of the political maneuvering behind his back, regarded Halleck as "one of the greatest men of the age" and Maj. Gen. William T. Sherman described him as the "directing genius" of the events that had given the Union cause such a "tremendous lift" in the previous months. This performance can be attributed to Halleck's strategy, administrative skills, and his good management of resources, and to the excellent execution by his subordinates—Grant, Maj. Gen. Samuel R. Curtis at Pea Ridge, and Maj. Gen. John Pope at Island Number 10. Military historians disagree about Halleck's personal role in providing these victories. Some offer him the credit based on his overall command of the department; others, particularly those viewing his career through the lens of later events, believe that his subordinates were the primary factor.

On March 11, 1862, Halleck's command was enlarged to include Ohio and Kansas, along with Buell's Army of the Ohio, and was renamed the Department of the Mississippi. Grant's Army of the Tennessee was attacked on April 6 at Pittsburg Landing, Tennessee, in the Battle of Shiloh. With reinforcements from Buell, on April 7 Grant managed to repulse the Confederate Army under Generals Albert Sidney Johnston and P.G.T. Beauregard, but at high cost in casualties. Pursuant to an earlier plan, Halleck arrived to take personal command of his massive army in the field for the first time. Grant was under public attack over the slaughter at Shiloh, and Halleck replaced Grant as a wing commander and assigned him instead to serve as second-in-command of the entire 100,000 man force, a job which Grant complained was a censure and akin to an arrest. Halleck proceeded to conduct operations against Beauregard's army in Corinth, Mississippi, called the siege of Corinth because Halleck's army, twice the size of Beauregard's, moved so cautiously and stopped daily to erect elaborate field fortifications; Beauregard eventually abandoned Corinth without a fight.

General in Chief

In the aftermath of the failed Peninsula Campaign in Virginia, President Lincoln summoned Halleck to the East to become General in Chief of the Armies of the United States, as of July 23, 1862. Lincoln hoped that Halleck could prod his subordinate generals into taking more coordinated, aggressive actions across all of the theaters of war, but he was quickly disappointed, and was quoted as regarding him as "little more than a first rate clerk." Grant replaced Halleck in command of most forces in the West, but Buell's Army of the Ohio was separated and Buell reported directly to Halleck, as a peer of Grant. Halleck began transferring divisions from Grant to Buell; by September, four divisions had moved, leaving Grant with 46,000 men.

In Washington, Halleck continued to excel at administrative issues and facilitated the training, equipping, and deployment of thousands of Union soldiers over vast areas. He was unsuccessful, however, as a commander of the field armies or as a grand strategist. His cold, abrasive personality alienated his subordinates; one observer described him as a "cold, calculating owl." Historian Steven E. Woodworth wrote, "Beneath the ponderous dome of his high forehead, the General would gaze goggle-eyed at those who spoke to him, reflecting long before answering and simultaneously rubbing both elbows all the while, leading one observer to quip that "the great intelligence he was reputed to possess must be located in his elbows." This disposition also made him unpopular with the Union press corps, who criticized him frequently.

Halleck, more a bureaucrat than a soldier, was able to impose little discipline or direction on his field commanders. Strong personalities such as George B. McClellan, John Pope, and Ambrose Burnside routinely ignored his advice and instructions. A telling example of his lack of control was during the Northern Virginia Campaign of 1862, when Halleck was unable to motivate McClellan to reinforce Pope in a timely manner, contributing to the Union defeat at the Second Battle of Bull Run. It was from this incident that Halleck fell from grace. Abraham Lincoln said that he had given Halleck full power and responsibility as general in chief. "He ran it on that basis till Pope's defeat; but ever since that event he has shrunk from responsibility whenever it was possible."In Halleck's defense, his subordinate commanders in the Eastern Theater, whom he did not select, were reluctant to move against General Robert E. Lee and the Army of Northern Virginia. Many of his generals in the West, other than Grant, also lacked aggressiveness. And despite Lincoln's pledge to give the general in chief full control, both he and Secretary of War Edwin M. Stanton micromanaged many aspects of the military strategy of the nation. Halleck wrote to Sherman, "I am simply a military advisor of the Secretary of War and the President, and must obey and carry out what they decide upon, whether I concur in their decisions or not. As a good soldier I obey the orders of my superiors. If I disagree with them I say so, but when they decide, is my duty faithfully to carry out their decision."

Chief of staff
On March 12, 1864, after Ulysses S. Grant, Halleck's former subordinate in the West, was promoted to lieutenant general and general in chief, Halleck was relegated to chief of staff, responsible for the administration of the vast U.S. armies. Grant and the War Department took special care to let Halleck down gently. Their orders stated that Halleck had been relieved as general in chief "at his own request."

Now that there was an aggressive general in the field, Halleck's administrative capabilities complemented Grant's field operations and they worked well together. Throughout the arduous Overland Campaign and Richmond-Petersburg Campaign of 1864, Halleck saw to it that Grant was properly supplied, equipped, and reinforced on a scale that wore down the Confederates. He agreed with Grant and Sherman on the implementation of a hard war toward the Southern economy and endorsed both Sherman's March to the Sea and Maj. Gen. Philip Sheridan's destruction of the Shenandoah Valley. However, the 1864 Red River Campaign, a doomed attempt to occupy Eastern Texas, had been advocated by Halleck, over the objections of Nathaniel P. Banks, who commanded the operation. When the campaign failed, Halleck claimed to Grant that it had been Banks' idea in the first place, not his  -  an example of Halleck's habit of deflecting blame.

Still, his contributions to military theory are credited with encouraging a new spirit of professionalism in the army.

Postbellum career

After Grant forced Lee's surrender at Appomattox Court House, Halleck was assigned to command the Military Division of the James, headquartered at Richmond. He was present at Lincoln's death and a pall-bearer at Lincoln's funeral. He lost his friendship with General William T. Sherman when he quarreled with him over Sherman's tendency to be lenient toward former Confederates. In August 1865 he was transferred to the Division of the Pacific in California, essentially in military exile. While holding this command he accompanied photographer Eadweard Muybridge to the newly purchased Russian America. He and Senator Charles Sumner are credited with applying the name "Alaska" to that region. In March 1869, he was assigned to command the Military Division of the South, headquartered in Louisville, Kentucky.

Henry Halleck became ill in early 1872 and his condition was diagnosed as edema caused by liver disease.  He died at his post in Louisville. He is buried in Green-Wood Cemetery, in Brooklyn, New York, and is commemorated by a street named for him in San Francisco and a statue in Golden Gate Park. He left no memoirs for posterity and apparently destroyed his private correspondence and memoranda. His estate at his death showed a net value of $474,773.16 ($ in  dollars). His widow, Elizabeth, married Col. George Washington Cullum in 1875. Cullum had served as Halleck's chief of staff in the Western Theater and then on his staff in Washington.

Dates of rank

Selected works
 Report on the Means of National Defence (1843)
 Elements of Military Art and Science (1846)
 International law, or, Rules regulating the intercourse of states in peace and war (1861)
 The Mexican War in Baja California: the memorandum of Captain Henry W. Halleck concerning his expeditions in Lower California, 1846–1848 (posthumous, 1977)
 Editor, Bitumen: Its Varieties, Properties, and Uses (1841)
 Translator, A Collection of Mining Laws of Spain and Mexico (1859)
 Translator, Life of Napoleon by Baron Antoine-Henri Jomini (1864) published by David Van Nostrand, link from Google books

Namesakes
 Fort Halleck (1862–66): Military outpost in Dakota Territory built to protect travelers on the Overland Trail.
 Halleck, Nevada, an unincorporated community
 Halleck Street in San Francisco near the Presidio.
Halleck Cottage was the name given to one of the homes at the San Francisco Protestant Orphanage (current name: Edgewood Center) in remembrance to a donation made to Mrs. Haight and Mrs. Waller who served as board managers at the time for the San Francisco Orphan Asylum Society (SFOA).

In popular media
 Halleck is a character in some American Civil War alternate histories, including the novels Stars and Stripes Forever (1998) by Harry Harrison and Gettysburg: A Novel of the Civil War (2003) by Newt Gingrich and William R. Forstchen. In Harrison's novel, while Halleck's role is fairly important, he does not personally appear.
 In the 1941 film They Died With Their Boots On, Sydney Greenstreet plays General Winfield Scott, however the fictionalized Scott is a conflation partly based on Halleck.
 In the 1994 film Quiz Show, Halleck is the correct answer to an 11-point question posed to Charles Van Doren that gives him his first victory on Twenty-One.

See also
 List of American Civil War generals (Union)
 Halleck: Lincoln's Chief of Staff

Notes

References
 Anders, Curt Henry Halleck's War: A Fresh Look at Lincoln's Controversial General-in-Chief. Guild Press of Indiana,1999. .
 Ambrose, Stephen. Halleck: Lincoln's Chief of Staff. Baton Rouge: Louisiana State University Press, 1999. .
 Eicher, John H., and David J. Eicher. Civil War High Commands. Stanford, CA: Stanford University Press, 2001. .
 Fredriksen, John C. "Henry Wager Halleck." In Encyclopedia of the American Civil War: A Political, Social, and Military History, edited by David S. Heidler and Jeanne T. Heidler. New York: W. W. Norton & Company, 2000. .
 Gott, Kendall D. Where the South Lost the War: An Analysis of the Fort Henry—Fort Donelson Campaign, February 1862. Mechanicsburg, PA: Stackpole Books, 2003. .
 Hattaway, Herman, and Archer Jones. How the North Won: A Military History of the Civil War. Urbana: University of Illinois Press, 1983. .
 Marszalek, John F. Commander of All Lincoln's Armies: A Life of General Henry W. Halleck. Boston: Belknap Press of Harvard University Press, 2004. .
 Nevin, David, and the Editors of Time-Life Books. The Road to Shiloh: Early Battles in the West. Alexandria, VA: Time-Life Books, 1983. .
 Smith, Jean Edward. Grant. New York: Simon & Schuster, 2001. .
 Schenker, Carl R., Jr. "Ulysses in His Tent: Halleck, Grant, Sherman, and 'The Turning Point of the War'." Civil War History (June 2010), vol. 56, no. 2, 175.
 The Union Army; A History of Military Affairs in the Loyal States, 1861–65 — Records of the Regiments in the Union Army — Cyclopedia of Battles — Memoirs of Commanders and Soldiers. Vol. 8. Wilmington, NC: Broadfoot Publishing, 1997. First published 1908 by Federal Publishing Company.
 Warner, Ezra J. Generals in Blue: Lives of the Union Commanders. Baton Rouge: Louisiana State University Press, 1964. .
 Woodworth, Steven E. Nothing but Victory: The Army of the Tennessee, 1861–1865. New York: Alfred A. Knopf, 2005. .
 California State Military Museum description of Halleck in California

Further reading
 Grant, Ulysses S. Personal Memoirs of U. S. Grant. 2 vols. Charles L. Webster & Company, 1885–86. .
 Simon, John Y. Grant and Halleck: Contrasts in Command. Frank L. Klement Lectures, No. 5. Milwaukee, WI: Marquette University Press, 1996. .

External links

 Biography at civilwarhome.com
 Biography at Mr. Lincoln's White House 
 
 
 Major General Henry Hallek at World Digital Library

1815 births
1872 deaths
People from Westernville, New York
United States Military Academy alumni
Union Army generals
People of California in the American Civil War
American militia generals
Burials at Green-Wood Cemetery
Union College (New York) alumni
Law in the San Francisco Bay Area
Commanding Generals of the United States Army
19th-century American lawyers